Family of Cops 3 is a 1999 American made-for-television crime drama film starring Charles Bronson. It is the final film in the Family of Cops trilogy and Bronson's final film before his death in 2003.

Plot
Chief Inspector Paul Fein and his eldest son Inspector Ben Fein investigate the double murder of wealthy banker Phillip Chandler (whose family is also in politics) and his wife in their home. Their first suspect, the spoiled and rotten heir Evan Chandler, is later found murdered in his car. Paul is likely to succeed the chief of police who is about to retire, but then finds the chief was involved in a major drug-related corruption web, and when the chief is killed in a drive-by shooting, Paul becomes the target of various unfounded accusations and gets taken off the case. However, Paul and Ben keep investigating off the books, forcing a fiscal investigator to collaborate. Meanwhile, youngest daughter Jackie finally graduates from the police academy and takes her first job at the same police station that the Fein family works at, while youngest son Eddie feels guilty for failing to save his partner's life in a drug raid shootout, even if he is officially cleared, in which Eddie decides to quit the force. Eddie soon gets romantically involved with Caroline Chandler and later saves her life from the unknown killer who is now targeting her. Elsewhere, as Paul continues his romance with Detective Anna Meyer, he also learns that his eldest daughter, Kate, is pregnant and she decides to keep the baby in order to raise the child as a single mother.

Cast

 Charles Bronson as Commissioner Paul Fein
 Sebastian Spence as Eddie Fein
 Joe Penny as Ben Fein
 Barbara Williams as Kate Fein
 Nicole de Boer as Jackie Fein
 Sean McCann as Jim Grkowski

References

External links
 
 

1999 television films
1999 films
1999 crime drama films
American crime drama films
Crime television films
Television sequel films
CBS network films
Trimark Pictures films
Films scored by Fred Mollin
American drama television films
Films directed by Sheldon Larry
1990s American films